Postcodes in Australia are used to more efficiently sort and route mail within the Australian postal system. Postcodes in Australia have four digits and are placed at the end of the Australian address, before the country. Postcodes were introduced in Australia in 1967 by the Postmaster-General's Department and are now managed by Australia Post, Australia's national postal service. Postcodes are published in booklets available from post offices or online from the Australia Post website.

Australian envelopes and postcards often have four square boxes printed in orange at the bottom right for the postcode. These are used to assist with the automated sorting of mail that has been addressed by hand for Australian delivery.

History
Postcodes were introduced in Australia in 1967 by the Postmaster-General's Department (PMG) to replace earlier postal sorting systems, such as Melbourne's letter and number codes (e.g., N3, E5) and a similar system then used in rural and regional New South Wales. The introduction of the postcodes coincided with the introduction of a large-scale mechanical mail sorting system in Australia, starting with the Sydney GPO.

By 1968, 75% of mail was using postcodes, and in the same year post office preferred-size envelopes were introduced, which came to be referred to as “standard envelopes”.

Postcode squares were introduced in June 1990 to enable Australia Post to use optical character recognition (OCR) software in its mail sorting machines to automatically and more quickly sort mail by postcodes.

Format
Australian postcodes consist of four digits, and are written after the name of the city, suburb, or town, and the state or territory:

Recipient Name
100 Citizen Road
BLACKTOWN NSW 2148

When writing an address by hand, and a row of four boxes is pre-printed on the lower right-hand corner of an envelope, the postcode may be written in the boxes instead. When posting to an organisation, business names can be written instead of a recipient name. If an article is intended for a specific identity within an organisation, their identity can be prepended on the line above the business name, with c/- prepended to the business name. 

If addressing a letter from outside Australia, the postcode is recorded before 'Australia', which is placed on a fourth line.

Geography
Australian postcodes are sorting information. They are often linked with one area (e.g. 6160 belongs only to Fremantle, Western Australia). Due to postcode rationalisation, they can be quite complex, especially in country areas (e.g. 2570 belongs to twenty-two towns and suburbs around Camden, New South Wales). The south-western Victoria 3221 postcode of the Geelong Mail Centre also includes twenty places around Geelong with very few people. This means that mail for these places is not fully sorted until it gets to Geelong. Some postcodes cover large populations (e.g., postcode 4350 serving some 100,000 people in Toowoomba and the surrounding area), while other postcodes have much smaller populations, even in urban areas. Australian postcodes range from 0200 for the Australian National University (now 2601) to 9944 for Cannonvale, Queensland.

Some towns and suburbs have two postcodes — one for street deliveries and another for post office boxes. For example, a street address in the Sydney suburb of Parramatta would be written like this:

Mr John Smith
99 George Street
PARRAMATTA NSW 2150

But mail sent to a PO Box in Parramatta would be addressed:

Mr John Smith
PO Box 99
PARRAMATTA NSW 2124

Many large businesses, government departments and other institutions receiving high volumes of mail had their own postcode as a Large Volume Receiver (LVR), e.g. the Royal Brisbane and Women's Hospital has the postcode 4029, the Australian National University had the postcode 0200. More postcode ranges were made available for LVRs in the 1990s.  Australia Post has been progressively discontinuing the LVR programme since 2006.

Places without postcodes 
Some places in Australia do not have postcodes. These are typically remote areas with little or no population.

Allocation

Australian states and territories
The first one or two numerals usually show the state or territory that the postcode belongs to
                         

Sometimes near the state and territory borders, Australia Post finds it easier to send mail through a nearby post office that is across the border:

Some of the postcodes above may cover two or more states. For example, postcode 2620 covers both a locality in NSW (Gundaroo) as well as a locality in the ACT (Hume), and postcode 0872 covers a number of localities across WA, SA and NT.

Three locations (Mingoola, Mungindi and Texas) straddle the NSW-Queensland border (so same town name and postcode on both sides).

Jervis Bay Territory, once an exclave of the ACT but now a separate territory, is geographically located on the coast of NSW. It is just south of the towns of Vincentia and Huskisson, with which it shares a postcode. Mail to the Jervis Bay Territory is still addressed to the ACT.

The numerals used to show the state on each radio callsign in Australia are the same numeral as the first numeral for postcodes in that state, e.g. 2xx in New South Wales, 3xx in Victoria, etc. Radio callsigns pre-date postcodes in Australia by more than forty years.

External territories
Australia's external territories are also included in Australia Post's postcode system. While these territories do not belong to any state, they are addressed as such for mail sorting:

Three scientific bases in Antarctica operated by the Australian National Antarctic Research Expeditions share a postcode with the isolated sub-Antarctic island of Macquarie Island (part of Tasmania):

There is also a "special" postcode for routing mail sent to Santa:

State and territory capital cities
Each state's capital city ends with three zeroes, while territorial capital cities end with two zeroes. Capital city postcodes were the lowest postcodes in their state or territory range, before new ranges for LVRs and PO Boxes were made available. The last numeral can usually be changed from "0" to "1" to get the postcode for General Post Office boxes in any capital city (though Perth now uses a different range of postcodes for its GPO Boxes):

Allocation within states
While the first numeral of a postcode usually shows the state or territory, the second numeral usually shows a region within the state. However, postcodes with the same second numeral are not always next to each other. As an example, postcodes in the range 2200–2299 are split between the southern suburbs of Sydney and the Central Coast, Lake Macquarie and Newcastle regions of New South Wales.

Postcodes with a second numeral of "0" or "1" are almost always located within the metropolitan area of the state's capital city. Postcodes with higher second numerals are usually located in rural and regional areas. Common exceptions are where towns were  rural when postcodes were first introduced in 1967, but have since been suburbanised and incorporated into metropolitan areas, e.g. Penrith, New South Wales has the postcode 2750 and Petrie, Queensland has the postcode 4502.

Within each region with the same second numeral, postcodes are usually allocated in ascending order the further one travels from the state's capital city along major highways and railways. For instance, heading north on the North Coast railway in New South Wales away from Sydney:

Major towns and cities
Major towns and cities tend to have "0" as the last numeral or last two numerals, e.g. Rockhampton, Queensland has the postcode 4700 and Ballarat, Victoria has the postcode 3350. There are exceptions; the major town of Ipswich, Queensland has the postcode 4305, while Goodna, a relatively small suburb of Ipswich, is allocated 4300.

Postcode squares
Australia Post prefers envelopes sold in Australia to have four boxes in the bottom right corner of the front of the envelope. Entering the postcode in these boxes or squares, which Australia Post calls postcode squares, enables Australia Post to use optical character recognition software in its mail sorting machines to automatically and more quickly sort mail into postcodes, which also embeds routing information. Postcode squares were introduced in June 1990.

Australia Post says that postcode squares should not be used for machine-addressed mail, or mail going overseas.

Other uses 
Many other organisations now use postcodes. Insurance companies often use postcodes when working out the cost of car and house insurance. Transport for NSW uses postcodes to give specific numbers for each bus stop in Greater Sydney.  The stop number is five to seven numbers: the first four are the postcode, and the others show the bus stop (sometimes written with a space in between, e.g. "2000 108").

Many companies that produce metropolitan street maps also list the postcodes for each suburb, both in indexes and on the maps themselves. Spatial representation of postcodes is also very popular in defining sales and franchise territories.

Australian Bureau of Statistics, Australian Taxation Office and many other Federal and State government organisations publish a variety of statistics by postcode which extends the use Australia Post four digit code to many business and social planning related activities.

There is an inherent problem with spatial representation of postcodes since areas referenced to a specific postal code tend to change over time, as new postcodes are added or existing ones are split by Australia Post for operational purposes.

Some mail generating software can automatically sort outward mail by postcode before it is generated. This pre-sort of mail into postcode order eliminates the need for it to be  sorted manually or using mail sorting machines.

Mechanised sorting 

To improve mechanised sorting, each address now has a sorting number which is printed on the letter as an orange-coloured barcode. This number might be 12 digits long. This system enables the post office to place items in delivery order. Companies can also use Rapid Addressing Tool (RATS) to print Customer Addressed Barcodes, which are printed above the address. Every Delivery Point in Australia (DPID) has its own number. Barcode sorter machines sort and sequence letters up to C5 size. Flat multi-level OCR reads, imprints and sorts C5 to A3 sized articles.

See also
 Postcodes in the United Kingdom - the United Kingdom equivalent
Postal codes in New Zealand - the equivalent in New Zealand
 ZIP code - the United States equivalent

References

External links
 Postcodes Australia - Australia Post's postcode search
 Australian Bureau of Statistics data related to postcodes
 Free Australia postcode maps by state and city
 Public domain database (XLS,CSV,XML,JSON) of Australia postcodes and geographical data

 
Australia
Postal history of Australia